The Showa Museum of Art (昭和美術館 Shōwa Bijitsukan) is a private art museum located in the Shiomi district of Shōwa-ku, Nagoya, Aichi Prefecture, Japan.

History 
The collection is by the local Gifu-born businessman Kozo Goto (1881-1977). The museum was founded in 1978. It consists of many items of Japanese ceramics also used for Japanese tea ceremony, including three works designated as Important Cultural Properties and four works designated as Important Art Objects.

It is housed in his former residence and garden. 

Nearby the museum is Nanzan University and the Kuwayama Art Museum.

Accessibility 
The nearest subway station is Irinaka Station.

References

External links 

 Homepage of the Showa Museum of Art
 Aichi Prefecture | Showa Museum of Art

Art museums and galleries in Nagoya
Ceramics museums in Japan
Art museums established in 1978
1978 establishments in Japan